3841 Dicicco, provisional designation , is a stony Florian asteroid and synchronous binary system from the inner regions of the asteroid belt, approximately 5 kilometers in diameter. It was discovered on 4 November 1983, by American astronomer Brian Skiff at Lowell's Anderson Mesa Station near Flagstaff, Arizona, in the United States. It was named after American astronomer Dennis di Cicco. Its minor-planet moon, provisionally designated , was discovered in 2014.

Orbit and classification 

Dicicco is  member of the Flora family, one of the largest groups of stony asteroids in the inner main-belt. It orbits the Sun at a distance of 1.9–2.6 AU once every 3 years and 5 months (1,252 days). Its orbit has an eccentricity of 0.16 and an inclination of 5° with respect to the ecliptic.

Physical characteristics 

Dicicco is a stony S-type asteroid in the SMASS classification.

Rotation period 

In December 2014, two rotational lightcurves of Dicicco were obtained from photometric observations by an international collaboration of American and European astronomers. Lightcurve analysis gave a rotation period of 3.5949 and 3.5950 hours with a brightness amplitude of 0.18 and 0.19 magnitude, respectively.

Diameter and albedo 

According to the survey carried out by NASA's Wide-field Infrared Survey Explorer with its subsequent NEOWISE mission, Dicicco measures between 4.74 and 6.45 kilometers in diameter and its surface has an albedo between 0.294 and 0.38. The Collaborative Asteroid Lightcurve Link assumes an albedo of 0.24 — derived from 8 Flora, the family's largest member and namesake – and derives a diameter of 5.10 kilometers using an absolute magnitude of 13.63.

Satellite 

During the photometric observations made in December 2014, it was revealed that Dicicco is a synchronous binary asteroid. Its minor-planet moon, designated  measures at least 1.67 kilometers in diameter based on a diameter-ratio of larger than 0.28. Its orbit has an estimated semi-major axis of 12 kilometers, and a derived period of 21.63 and 21.641 hours, respectively.

Naming 

This minor planet was named after American amateur astronomer and astrophotographer Dennis di Cicco. The approved naming citation was published by the Minor Planet Center on 10 April 1990.

Notes

References

External links 
 Asteroids with Satellites, Robert Johnston, johnstonsarchive.net
 Asteroid Lightcurve Database (LCDB), query form (info )
 Dictionary of Minor Planet Names, Google books
 Asteroids and comets rotation curves, CdR – Observatoire de Genève, Raoul Behrend
 Discovery Circumstances: Numbered Minor Planets (1)-(5000) – Minor Planet Center
 
 

003841
Discoveries by Brian A. Skiff
Named minor planets
003841
003841
19831104